Ollie Pidgley (born 25 August 1997) is a British racing driver, who will compete in the British Touring Car Championship with Trade Price Cars with Brisky Racing. He had previously competed in MSA Formula, Renault UK Clio Cup and the Mini Challenge UK.

Racing Record

Complete British Touring Car Championship results
(key) (Races in bold indicate pole position – 1 point awarded in first race; races in italics indicate fastest lap – 1 point awarded all races; * signifies that driver lead race for at least one lap – 1 point awarded all races)

References

1997 births
Living people
British Touring Car Championship drivers
English racing drivers
British racing drivers
Renault UK Clio Cup drivers
Mini Challenge UK drivers

British F4 Championship drivers